The Goonies: Original Motion Picture Soundtrack is the official soundtrack album released by Epic Records in conjunction with the 1985 film The Goonies. The album is known primarily because it included the song "The Goonies 'R' Good Enough" by singer Cyndi Lauper, who had a cameo in the film (as herself, singing the song on TV). The album was released in LP and cassette format internationally, and a limited CD release in some countries. 

Lauper was asked by Steven Spielberg to be the musical director for the album. It was Lauper's idea to include a then-relatively unknown female group, The Bangles (the band would become better known the following year with their second album). The Bangles also had a small cameo in the video for "The Goonies 'R' Good Enough". Lauper played the song throughout her True Colors World Tour, but refused to play the song from 1987 onwards until pressure from fans finally made her add the song back into her set list, beginning with her True Colors Tour in 2007 and 2008.  

Another single, "Eight Arms to Hold You" by Goon Squad, was pressed on vinyl with dance remixes and reached number one on the Billboard Hot Dance Club Play chart in 1985. The scene featuring the song (involving an octopus) was cut from the film.

Teena Marie's contribution "14k" was released as a single and hit number ten on the R&B chart.

REO Speedwagon's song "Wherever You're Goin' (It's Alright)" was released as a single in Europe, although it did not chart.

In 2000, the group A New Found Glory released an EP of cover versions of songs from movies—called From the Screen to Your Stereo—which included a version of "The Goonies 'R' Good Enough". 

In 2010, an original score album was released featuring the entire film score by Dave Grusin.

Track listing

11. "Eight Arms to Hold You" (Vocal Remix) — Goon Squad
12. "The Goonies 'R' Good Enough" (Dance Remix) — Cyndi Lauper

Notes
 "Fratelli Chase" was omitted from the soundtrack, but is available on Dave Grusin's 1987  album, Cinemagic.

Chart performance

Release dates

Reception
Paste described the soundtrack as a compilation of "ultra-fun — albeit ultra-dated — synth-heavy, gated-drums-anchored tunes."

References

The Goonies
Goonies
Albums produced by David Kahne
Goonies
Goonies
Albums with cover art by Drew Struzan
Adventure film soundtracks